Phaeapate is a genus of longhorn beetles of the subfamily Lamiinae, containing the following species:

 Phaeapate albula Pascoe, 1865
 Phaeapate denticollis Pascoe, 1867

References

Desmiphorini